"Blue Moon" is a song written by Gary Leach and Mark Tinney, and recorded by American country music artist Steve Holy. It was released in April 2000 as the second single and title track from his debut album Blue Moon.  The song peaked at number 24 on the Billboard Hot Country Singles & Tracks chart and reached number 47 on the RPM Country Tracks chart in Canada.

Critical reception
Deborah Evans Price of Billboard gave the song a negative review, calling it a "lackluster ballad that fails to help Holy distinguish himself from the pack." Price wrote that Holy "has a pleasant voice, seasoned by performing on the competitive Texas music circuit, but somehow this record just doesn't take off."

Charts

Weekly charts

Year-end charts

References

2000 singles
2000 songs
Steve Holy songs
Curb Records singles
Music videos directed by Sherman Halsey